The 1918 Howard Bulldogs football team was an American football team that represented Howard College (now known as the Samford University) as a member of the Southern Intercollegiate Athletic Association (SIAA) during the 1918 college football season. In their first year under head coach Max James, the team compiled an 0–2 record.

Schedule

References

Howard
Samford Bulldogs football seasons
College football winless seasons
Howard Bulldogs football